Léon Robin (Nantes, 17 January 1866July 1947) was a French philosopher and scholar of Greek philosophy, professor of history of ancient philosophy at the Sorbonne from 1924 to 1936.

Robin, the son of a merchant, began teaching in the Faculty of Letters at Paris in 1913. In 1924 he took up the chair of history of ancient philosophy, which had lapsed after the death of Louis Rodier in 1913. In 1927 he was visiting professor at the University of Pennsylvania. On his retirement from the Paris chair, his successor was Pierre-Maxime Schuhl. Robin subsequently served as Director of the International Institute of Philosophy.

Léon Robin translated the dialogues of Plato into French.

Works
La théorie platonicienne des idées et des nombres d'après Aristote; étude historique et critique, 1908
La théorie platonicienne de l'amour, 1908
(transl. and ed.) Plato, Oeuvres complètes, 1920
La pensée grecque et les origines de l'esprit scientifique, 1923. English translation, Greek thought and the origins of the scientific spirit, 1928
La morale antique, 1938
Pyrrhon et le scepticisme grec, 1944

References

External links

 

1866 births
1947 deaths
French philosophers
French historians of philosophy
French male non-fiction writers
French translators